Pai dong is a type of fixed-pitch hawker stall in Hong Kong.  

In May 2013, there were around 2600 such cabinet-type stalls in Hong Kong, mainly in the urban area on Hong Kong Island and in Kowloon (such as Central, Wan Chai, Mong Kok, Yau Ma Tei and Sham Shui Po). They typically sell goods such as fashion items, watches or toys.

Notable sites of pai dongs 
Temple Street (Yau Ma Tei section)
Fa Yuen Street
Canton Road (Mong Kok section)
Tung Choi Street (Ladies' Market)

See also
Dai pai dong

References

Cantonese words and phrases
Buildings and structures in Hong Kong